Sierra El Aliso is a mountain range in the state of Sonora, Mexico.

Location

The Sierra El Aliso is adjacent to the Sierra de San Javier.
Both lie in the Barranca Basin.

Environment

Most of the rainfall occurs in July, August and September.
At higher elevations the range holds oak and pine trees, while lower down there is underbrush, some cacti, grass and small shrubs.
The sierra contains the village of San Antonio de la Huerta, with about 500 people in 1990, mostly engaged in mining, cattle ranching and agriculture.
Of these, mining is the main occupation.

Geology

The Sierra El Aliso is near the center of the Mojave-Sonora Megashear, where both deep water Paleozoic deposits and miogeoclinal shelf facies are found.
During the Paleozoic huge volumes of sediments accumulated in deep basins beside the western margin of the North American continent, and were then deformed and thrust faulted against miogeoclinal shelf rocks of the continent during the Antler and Sonoma orogenies.
The Sierra El Aliso is composed of assemblages of Paleozoic origin, with less significant volcanic rocks of Triassic and perhaps Cretaceous-Tertiary origin.
Middle Mississippian fossils in the Sonora allochthon have been found in the Sierra El Aliso.
Possible Early Pennsylvanian foraminifera were also found.
An assemblage of conodonts from late Meramecian to early Chesterian would have formed in deep water.

Notes

Sources

Mountains of Mexico